The List of Commonly Used Characters in Modern Chinese is a list of 7,000 commonly used Chinese characters in Chinese. It was created in 1988 in the People's Republic of China.

The List of Frequently Used Characters in Modern Chinese is a sub-list of 3,500 frequently used Chinese characters in Chinese.

In 2013, the Table of General Standard Chinese Characters has replaced the List of Commonly Used Characters in Modern Chinese as the standard for Chinese characters in the People's Republic of China.

References

External links 

 Alternative lists of common Chinese characters at Learnchineseok.com
 Frequency list
 CJK-CODE

Chinese characters
1988 documents